Pat Morton (21 December 1920 – 20 February 2003) was a South African wrestler. He competed in the men's freestyle light heavyweight at the 1948 Summer Olympics.

References

External links
 

1920 births
2003 deaths
South African male sport wrestlers
Olympic wrestlers of South Africa
Wrestlers at the 1948 Summer Olympics
People from Boksburg
Commonwealth Games medallists in wrestling
Commonwealth Games gold medallists for South Africa
Wrestlers at the 1950 British Empire Games
Sportspeople from Gauteng
Medallists at the 1950 British Empire Games